Events in the year 1691 in Norway.

Incumbents
Monarch: Christian V

Events
The Åmdal copperwork is established.

Arts and literature

Births

17 July – Peder von Todderud, Army general and landowner (d. 1772).

Deaths

References